The White Hell of Pitz Palu may refer to:

 The White Hell of Pitz Palu (1929 film), a German silent mountain film
 The White Hell of Pitz Palu (1950 film), a West German mountain film